Drascalia praelonga is a species of beetle in the family Cerambycidae, the only species in the genus Drascalia.

References

Achrysonini